María Itatí Castaldi (born 16 October 1966) is an Argentinian basketball player, member of Paralympics team for her country.

Biography
Until 2006 she was a hockey player and member of Ferroviarios club. That year she travelled to Frank, Santa Fe province to play a match, but a car accident caused a spinal injury.

In 2012 she started to play basketball in CILSA and they called the selection, they are testing female players, and the experience that first was part of her rehabilitation, she took her of several international competitions.

References

External links 

Maria Itatí Castaldi - CILSA STA.FE - Pre Selección basquet sobre sillas, TV Coop Justiniano Posse

Argentine women's basketball players
Women's wheelchair basketball players
Paralympic competitors for Argentina
Argentine female field hockey players
1988 births
Living people